Bagby is a village and civil parish in the Hambleton District of North Yorkshire, England,  south-east of Thirsk. The parish had a population of 470 according to the 2001 census. The population of the parish was 593 at the 2011 Census. The parish shares a grouped parish council with the adjacent parish of Balk.

The village is a mixture of old and new properties, farms and some specialist furniture makers.

History 
The name Bagby comes from an Old Norse personal name Baggi + Old Norse býr, meaning "settlement" or "farmstead". Bagby is recorded in the Domesday Book as Bagebi/Baghebi. (The name is shared with the village of Bigby, Lincolnshire, and the hamlet of Begbie, near Haddington, East Lothian).

Religion 
The parish church is dedicated to St Mary. Located in Church Lane, it is a Grade II Listed Building designed by Edward Buckton Lamb and built in 1862.

Airfield
Bagby Airfield is situated on the southern edge of the village. The privately owned airfield is used by light aircraft and helicopters but has been the subject of various planning control issues relating to expansion, noise nuisance and increased air traffic.

References

External links

Villages in North Yorkshire
Civil parishes in North Yorkshire